The Autostrade (singular  ) are roads forming the Italian national system of motorways. In North and Central Italy, the Autostrade mainly consists of tollways managed by Autostrade per l'Italia, a holding company controlled by  Cassa Depositi e Prestiti. Other operators include ASTM, ATP, and Autostrade Lombarde in the north-west; Autostrada del Brennero, A4 Holding, Concessioni Autostradali Venete, and Autovie Venete in the north-east; Strada dei Parchi, SALT, SAT, and Autocisa in the center; and CAS in the south.

History
Italy became the first country to inaugurate motorways reserved for motor vehicles with the A8. The Milan-Laghi motorway (connecting Milan to Varese) was devised by Piero Puricelli, a civil engineer and entrepreneur. He received the first authorization to build a public-utility fast road in 1921, and completed the construction (one lane each direction) between 1924 and 1926. By the end of the 1930s, over 400 kilometers of multi- and dual-single-lane motorways had been constructed throughout Italy, linking cities and rural towns.

Traffic laws

Italy's autostrade must not be used by:

Pedestrians and animals (except in rest areas)
Pedal-cycles
Mopeds
Cars with a design speed on flat road less than  
Vehicles without tyres
Agricultural vehicles and technical vehicles (e.g. heavy equipment)

Speed

Limits for other vehicles (or during foul weather and/or low visibility) are lower. As of 2022, no road was utilizing this possibility.

List of current Autostrade

List of bretelle and raccordi autostradali
Some autostrade are called bretelle, diramazioni or raccordi because they are short and have few exits.

Bretelle, diramazioni or raccordi are generally connections between two motorways, or connections between motorways and important cities without a motorway.

They have the same number (sometimes with the suffix dir) as one of the two autostrade linked, a combination of the numbers of the two autostrade linked, or the number of the main autostrada.

Trafori (T)
Important alpine tunnels ( trafori) are identified by the capital letter "T" followed by a single digit number. Currently there are only three T-classified tunnels: Mont Blanc Tunnel (T1), Great St Bernard Tunnel (T2) and Frejus Road Tunnel (T4). Tunnels that cross the border between Italy and France (T1, T4) or Switzerland (T2), are treated as motorways (green signage, access control, and so on), although they are not proper motorways. The code T3 was once assigned to the Bargagli-Ferriere Tunnel in Ligurian Apennines before it was reclassified as SP 226.

Raccordi autostradali (RA)
RA stands for Raccordo autostradale (translated as "motorway connection"), a relatively short spur route that connects an autostrada to a nearby city or tourist resort not directly served by the motorway. These spurs are owned and managed by ANAS (with some exceptions, such as the RA7 that became A53 when assigned to a private company for maintenance). Some spurs are toll-free motorways (type-A), but most are type-B or type-C roads. All RA have separate carriageways with two lanes in each direction. Generally, they do not have an emergency lane.

Strade extraurbane principali 

Type B highway (or strada extraurbana principale), commonly but unofficially known as superstrada (Italian equivalent for expressway), is a divided highway with at least two lanes in each direction, paved shoulder on the right, no cross-traffic and no at-grade intersections. Access restrictions on such highways are exactly the same as autostrade. Signage at the beginning and the end of the highways is the same, except the background color is blue instead of green. The general speed limit on strade extraurbane principali is 110 km/h. Strade extraurbane principali are not tolled. All strade extraurbane principali are owned and managed by ANAS, and directly controlled by the Italian government or by the regions.

See also
State highway (Italy)
Transport in Italy
Rai isoradio
List of controlled-access highway systems
Evolution of motorway construction in European nations

References

External links
Autostrade per l'Italia Official website

 
Road transport in Italy
Lists of roads in Italy